Marti may refer to

People

Surname
 Benedictus Aretius (non-Latinized surname Marti; 1504-1574), Swiss Protestant theologian and natural philosopher
 Berthe Marti (1904–1995), Swiss scholar of mediaeval Latin
 Debbie Marti (born 1968), English high jumper
 Lara Marti (born 1999), Swiss footballer
 Marcel Marti (ski mountaineer) (born 1983), Swiss ski mountaineer
 Min Li Marti (born 1974), Swiss politician, publisher, sociologist and historian
 Yann Marti (born 1988), Swiss tennis player

Given name
 Marti Caine (1944–1995), English comedian
 Marti Noxon (born 1964), U.S. scriptwriter
 Marti Pellow (born 1965), Scottish singer
 Marti Webb (born 1944), UK singer/actress
 Marti Wong, Chinese games designer

Other uses
 Marti, Montopoli in Val d'Arno, a village in the province of Pisa, Italy
 MARTI Electronics, a manufacturer of remote location broadcasting equipment
 Soviet minelayer Marti, originally the Russian yacht Standart
 Marti Venturi, fictional character in the Canadian Disney Channel show Life with Derek

See also
Marty (disambiguation)
Martí (disambiguation)